The women's javelin throw athletics events for the 2016 Summer Paralympics take place at the Rio Olympic Stadium from 9 September. A total of 6 events are contested for 6 different classifications.

Competition format 
The competition for each classification consisted of a single round. Each athlete threw three times, after which the eight best threw three more times (with the best distance of the six throws counted).

Medal summary

Results

F13
The F13 event took place on 17 September.

F34
The F34 event took place on 9 September.

F37
The F37 event took place on 10 September.

F46
The F46 event took place on 13 September.

F54
The F54 event took place on 13 September.

F56
The F56 event took place on 10 September. The event incorporates athletes from classification F55 in addition to F56.

References

Athletics at the 2016 Summer Paralympics